The Athenian military was the old main force of Athens, one of the major city-states (poleis) of Ancient Greece. It was largely similar to other armies of the region – see Ancient Greek warfare.

Army 

In the manner of neighboring city-states, the backbone of the Athenian military on land was the Hoplite.  Accompanying every Hoplite was a lightly armed attendant, either a poor citizen who could not afford a regular suit of armor (panoplia), or possibly a trusted slave. These attendants carried the Hoplite's shield (aspis) until the battle and most of the baggage. While generally armed with javelins, they sometimes had spears, slings or bows.  The attendants acted as skirmishers before the pitched battle and were assigned to guard the camp during the actual fight. When the battle was over, they would attempt either to cover the retreat of the main body or slaughter the fleeing enemy forces if their own hoplites were victorious.

During and after the Peloponnesian Wars, the use and importance of light troops increased with the introduction of the peltasts: lightly armoured, if at all, and armed with javelins and a shield, the pelte. Their effectiveness in battle, even against the best-trained heavy hoplites, was demonstrated by the Athenian general Iphicrates, who annihilated an entire Spartan mora with his peltasts.

Navy 

During the Greco-Persian Wars, Athens developed a large, powerful navy in the eastern Mediterranean Sea that defeated the even larger Persian Navy at the Battle of Salamis. The Athenian Navy consisted of 80,000 crewing 400 ships. The backbone of the navy's manpower was a core of professional rowers drawn from the lower classes of Athenian society. This gave the Athenian fleets an advantage in training over the less professional fleets of its rivals. The main warships of the fleet were the triremes. With its fleet, Athens obtained hegemony over the rest of the Greek city-states forming the First Athenian Empire.  Its fleet was destroyed and its empire lost during the Peloponnesian War. Athens regained some of its naval power after the Second Athenian League was rebuilt; however, it never fully recovered as its rivals were much stronger than before.  The fleet included two sacred ships, the Paralus and the Salaminia used for diplomatic and ceremonial duties.

See also 
 Scythian archers, possible military police employed by Athens

References

Sources

Military history of Ancient Athens
Government of ancient Athens